The 1971 Coppa Italia Final was a final group of the 1970–71 Coppa Italia. From 1968 to 1971, FIGC introduced a final group instead of semi–finals and finals. In the final group, four teams played against each other home–and–away in a round–robin format (30 May – 23 June 1971). In the final group standings, the top two teams each had 7 points, and a tie–breaking match needed to be played.
The play–off match was played on 27 June 1971 between Torino and Milan. Torino won 5–3 on penalties after the match ended 0–0 after extra time.

Final group

Play–off final match

References 
Coppa Italia 1970/71 statistics at rsssf.com
 https://www.calcio.com/calendario/ita–coppa–italia–1970–1971–finale/2/
 https://www.worldfootball.net/schedule/ita–coppa–italia–1970–1971–finale/2/

Coppa Italia Finals
Coppa Italia Final 1971
Coppa Italia Final 1971
Coppa Italia Final 1971